Madhuca dubardii is a plant in the family Sapotaceae.

Description
The bark is reddish brown. Inflorescences bear up to four flowers.

Distribution and habitat
Madhuca dubardii grows naturally in Sumatra, Peninsular Malaysia and Borneo. Its habitat is lowland mixed dipterocarp forests from  altitude.

Conservation
Madhuca dubardii has been assessed as near threatened on the IUCN Red List. The species is threatened by logging and conversion of land for palm oil plantations.

References

dubardii
Trees of Sumatra
Trees of Peninsular Malaysia
Trees of Borneo
Plants described in 1925